Logan Thunder is a NBL1 North club based in Logan, Queensland, Australia. The club fields a team in both the Men's and Women's NBL1 North. The club is a division of Logan Basketball Inc., the major administrative basketball organisation in the region. The Thunder play their home games at Cornubia Park Sports Centre.

Club history
Logan Basketball Inc. was established in July 1998, and by the mid-2000s, senior representative teams were competing in the Southern Cross Cup. In 2006, the Thunder entered the Queensland Australian Basketball League (QABL), fielding both a men's and women's team. However, the club withdrew from the league following the 2008 season.

In September 2014, plans were made to bring the club back to life. Following 2008, Logan Basketball Inc. were unable to fund a state-league program due to all resources being used by the Logan Thunder WNBL team. In the wake of the collapse of the WNBL team, a QBL club was able to resurface for the 2015 season.

For the 2020 season, the Thunder joined the newly-established NBL1 North, which replaced the QBL. The Thunder women won the 2021 NBL1 North championship. In 2022, the women's team advanced to the NBL1 North Grand Final undefeated, but then lost the best-of-three series 2–0 to the Townsville Flames.

References

External links
Logan Basketball's official website

Queensland Basketball League teams
Basketball teams established in 2006
Basketball teams in Queensland
Logan Thunder
2006 establishments in Australia
Logan City